In Magajane v Chairperson, North West Gambling Board is an important case in South African criminal procedure. Magajane sought leave to appeal against the dismissal of his constitutional challenge to the provisions of section 65 of the North West Gambling Act. This challenge was on the ground that the provision violated his right to privacy by authorising inspectors to search his commercial premises and to seize items without a warrant. While the section authorised inspections of both licensed and unlicensed premises, he confined his challenge to inspections of unlicensed premises.

The court held that it had been established in Mistry v Interim National Medical and Dental Council of South Africa that "the scope of a person's privacy extends only to those aspects to which a legitimate expectation of privacy can be harboured."

The court also made it clear that a regulated business's right to privacy was softened the more its business was public, closely regulated and potentially hazardous to the public.

The question to be answered was whether the statute authorising the regulatory inspection could achieve its ends through means less damaging to the right to privacy: for example, by requiring a warrant. In other words, the court had to consider the applicant's expectation of privacy and the breadth of the legislation.

The court held that section 65 served the worthy goal of ensuring enforcement of the statute's regulation of the gambling industry, and that, although the owner or occupier of a gambling business generally had a low reasonable expectation of privacy in the gambling premises, the provisions relating to unlicensed premises were aimed at collecting evidence for criminal prosecution, and thus constituted significant intrusions. Their breadth extended the scope of permissible searches beyond situations in which the expectation of privacy was low, thereby endangering the privacy of property owners and occupiers who were not adequately informed of the limits of the inspection.

Furthermore, it was held that section 65 could achieve its purpose of promoting enforcement of the Act while simultaneously protecting the right to privacy of persons who were subjected to searches. Section 65 was accordingly held to be an unreasonable limitation of section 14 of the Constitution, and therefore unconstitutional. The application for leave to appeal was thus upheld, as was the appeal.

References
Annual Survey of South African Law 2006. Pages 46 and 71.
The Law of South Africa. Second Edition. LexisNexis. Durban. 2008. Volume 11. Durban. 2010. Volume 20. Part 1. Paragraphs 432 and 433 at page 421. Cumulative Supplement 2009. Volume 10(2). Paragraph 320.
Current Law Case Citator 2007. Page 168.
Nihal Jayawickrama. The Judicial Application of Human Rights Law. Second Edition. Cambridge University Press. 2017. Page 665.
Anne Hughes. Human dignity and fundamental rights in South Africa and Ireland. Pretoria University Law Press. 2014. Pages 157, 267 and 449.
Jean Meiring (ed). "2006". South Africa’s Constitution at Twenty-one. Penguin Books. 2017.
Justin Collings. Scales of Memory: Constitutional Justice and Historical Evil. Oxford University Press. 2021. Page 259.
"South Africa" [2006] Bulletin on Constitutional Case-law 300 at 303 and 305
Kremnitzer, Steiner and Lang. Proportionality in Action. Cambridge University Press. 2020. Pages 200, 241 and 265.
Niels Petersen. Proportionality and Judicial Activism. Cambridge University Press. 2017. Page 121.
Niels Petersen. Verhältnismäßigkeit als Rationalitätskontrolle. Mohr Siebeck. 2015. Page 227.
Christa Rautenbach, "South Africa: Teaching an Old Dog New Tricks?". Groppi and Ponthoreau (eds). The Use of Foreign Precedents by Constitutional Judges. Hart Publishing. 2013. Page 200. Andenæs and Fairgrieve (eds). Courts and Comparative Law. Oxford University Press. 2015. Page 368.
Dario Milo. Defamation and Freedom of Speech. OUP. 2008. Page 126.
Information and Communications Technology Law. LexisNexis. 2008. Page 353.

South African case law
2006 in case law
2006 in South African law